Aquinas Diocesan Grammar School is a co-educational Catholic grammar school situated on the Ravenhill Road, Belfast, Northern Ireland. It teaches a range of subjects. Its main education board of choice is CCEA, but the school also uses AQA and Edexcel for certain subjects.

History
Aquinas was established by the Diocese of Down and Connor as a co-educational voluntary Grammar School. It admitted the first 110 pupils in September 1993. The current building for which the school occupies finished construction in January 2003.

Motto and crest
The school's motto is Veritas Liberabit which is Latin for "The truth will set you free". The school crest is a circle half-surrounded by a 'mane' (representing the Evangelist Mark), and inside the circle in one half there is half of an ox (symbolising St Thomas Aquinas) and the symbol of the lamb and the keys.

Academics
It teaches a range of subjects. Its main education board of choice is CCEA, but the school also uses AQA and Edexcel for certain subjects.

In 2018 it was ranked joint first in Northern Ireland for its GCSE performance with 100% of its entrants receiving five or more GCSEs at grades A* to C, including the core subjects English and Maths.

In 2019 the school was ranked 11th out of 159 secondary schools in Northern Ireland with 88.4% of its A-level students who entered the exams in 2017/18 being awarded three A*-C grades.

In 2022 the school was ranked 2nd out of the top 10 performing schools in Northern Ireland and ranked 35th state and independent school in England, Wales and Northern Ireland in Parent Power, The Sunday Times Schools Guide 2023.

See also 
 List of secondary schools in Belfast

References

External links
Aquinas Grammar School website

Grammar schools in Belfast
Catholic secondary schools in Northern Ireland
1993 establishments in Northern Ireland
Educational institutions established in 1993